Jalal Abdul-Rahman  (born 6 May 1944) is a former Iraqi football goalkeeper who played for Iraq in the 1976 AFC Asian Cup. He played for the national team between 1970 and 1976.

Jalal played in the first World Cup qualifiers for Iraq.

References

Iraqi footballers
Iraq international footballers
1972 AFC Asian Cup players
1976 AFC Asian Cup players
Living people
1944 births
Association football goalkeepers